Tettau is a municipality  in the district of Kronach in Bavaria in Germany.

References

Kronach (district)